The Iranian Film Festival (IFF) was a film festival held annually in the Netherlands. Until now, the festival has taken place in Utrecht (2007), Rotterdam (2008), and in 2009 the festival will take place in filmtheatre De Fabriek in Zaandam.

Aim of the festival 
The Iranian Film Festival focuses on the film culture of contemporary Iran. The festival mainly shows the work of young, independent Iranian filmmakers, who give their vision of Iran with special attention to political and social aspects of Iranian society. In 2006 the festival only lasted one day, but because of its success it was expanded to three days in 2007.

The Iranian Film Festival was set up by an independent organisation, that cooperates with independent filmmakers, distributors and production companies from Iran. In this manner, the organisation has the freedom to compose its own program. The director of the Iranian Film Festival is Parwin Roghyeh Mirrahimy.

References

External links 
 (English version)
Filmtheatre and café De Fabriek, Zaandam

Film festivals in the Netherlands
Cinema of Iran